Ronaldo Lemos (Araguari, born March 25, 1976) is a Brazilian academic, lawyer and commentator on intellectual property, technology, and culture.

Lemos is the director of the Institute for Technology & Society of Rio de Janeiro (ITSrio.org), and professor at the Rio de Janeiro State University's Law School. He is also a partner with the law firm Rennó Penteado Advogados and a board member of various organizations, including the Mozilla Foundation, Accessnow.org, and Stellar. He was nominated a visiting professor of law, Technology and Policy at Columbia University´s School of International Public Affairs in 2017 and 2018.  He was appointed as a Young Global Leader by the World Economic Forum in 2015. He was appointed in November 2015 as a fellow by Ashoka, a civil society organization founded by Bill Drayton.

In May 2020 Lemos joined the first cohort of members of the Facebook Oversight Board

Lemos was one of the creators of the Marco Civil da Internet, a law enacted in April 2014, creating a comprehensive set or rights for the Internet in Brazil, including freedom of speech, privacy and net neutrality. Because of its impact in favor of an open and free internet, the Marco Civil da Internet law has been covered by publications such as the magazine The Economist, the Wall Street Journal, the Financial Times, the New York Times, and others. It has also been called by Tim Berners-Lee "a very good example of how governments can play a positive role in advancing web rights and keeping the web open".

In July 2020 Lemos was appointed Visiting Chair Professor of Technology at the Schwarzman College at Tsinghua University in Beijing, teaching the course "Technology Policy in the Developing World".

Lemos was one of the creators of Brazil's National Internet of Things (IoT) plan. The plan was commissioned by Brazil's National Development Bank (BNDES) and the Ministry of Science, Technology, Communications and Innovation (MCTI). The study was developed by Lemos's law firm (PNM Advogados) in partnership with McKinsey & Co and CPQD. Lemos was responsible for drafting the regulatory portion of the study, encompassing telecommunications, taxation, data protection, cybersecurity and other legal issues pertaining to the field of IoT. The study was published in May 2018.

Lemos is Project Lead of the Creative Commons Brazil, Creative Commons International (CCi).

Lemos' academic qualifications include a J.D., University of Sao Paulo Law School, a Master of Laws degree, Harvard Law School, and a Doctor of Law, University of Sao Paulo. In 2011, Lemos joined the Center for Information Technology Policy at Princeton University as a visiting fellow. In July 2013, Lemos joined the MIT Media Lab as a visiting scholar. He is also the liaison to the director of the MIT Media Lab for Brazil.

Lemos works with the Brazilian federal government on the implementation of its free software program. Lemos also works with the Ministry of Culture on the implementation of its digital culture policy, and was appointed by the Ministry of Justice to its electronic commerce commission.

Lemos is a founder of Overmundo, for which he received the Prix Ars Electronica Golden Nica in the category of digital communities.

Lemos founded the Center for Technology and Society at the Fundação Getulio Vargas (FGV) Law School in 2003, and was the director of the center until 2013, succeeded by the former Brazilian Supreme Court Justice Nelson Jobim. He was a co-founder of the Fundação Getulio Vargas Law School in Rio de Janeiro in 2002.

Lemos worked in 1990s at the law firm Suchodolski Advogados Associados, practicing technology, telecommunications and corporate law. He also worked as professor of Sociology of Law at the University of Sao Paulo Law School and at the Brazilian Society for Public Law (SBDP).

He also worked from 2006 to 2009 as a curator for Tim Festival, a large music festival in Brazil. In 2011 he wrote and presented a series of documentaries for MTV Brasil focused on technology and policy issues, called Mod MTV.

He was nominated in February 2012 as a member of the National Council for Fighting Piracy (CNCP), a federal government body coordinated by the Ministry of Justice in Brazil.

He was nominated in July 2012 as a member of the Council for Social Communication, a governmental body created by Article 224 of the Brazilian Constitution. The attributions of the Council include preparing studies, opinions, and recommendations to Congress regarding matters related to communication, media, and freedom of expression. The council has 13 members. Lemos was appointed counselor by the Brazilian parliament, and his substitute is Juca Ferreira, Brazil's former Minister of Culture. On 15 July 2015, he was appointed once again a member of the Council for Social Communications in Congress for a second term, and elected as its vice-president.

Lemos writes weekly to Folha de S.Paulo, the largest national newspaper in Brazil, and contributes to a number of other publications, including Foreign Affairs, Harper's Bazaar, and Bravo!. He also hosts a weekly TV show at Globonews, the biggest cable news channel in Brazil, called Navegador.

He is since 2010 a curator of the Itaú Cultural Encyclopedia on Art & Technology in Brazil.

Lemos is the host and screenplay writer of the documentary series about technology called Expresso Futuro, broadcast by Canal Futura and Fantástico in Brazil, and globally at YouTube and Globoplay. The first two seasons of the show were filmed in New York. The third season was filmed in China, in more than 10 cities. The forth season was recorded online in 2020, during the COVID-19 pandemic, and interviewed personalities like Jeffrey Sachs, Stephen Wolfram and the Chinese Sci-Fi writer Liu Cixin. The series was awarded the Best Documentary Prize by the Sichuan Television Festival, one of the largest in Asia.

Publications, interviews, and lectures 

Lemos has published a number of articles, given public lectures and published four books, Comércio Eletrônico (2001), Conflitos sobre Nomes de Domínio e Outras Questões Jurídicas da Internet (2003), Direito, Tecnologia e Cultura (2005), and Tecnobrega: o Pará Reinventando o Negócio da Mùsica (2008),and Futuros Possiveis: Mídia, Cultura, Sociedade, Direitos (2012).

The 2007 documentary Good Copy Bad Copy includes an interview with Lemos, in which he comments on the Brazilian Tecno brega industry and copyright.

Publicly available lectures from Lemos include:
Google Policy Talk: "Culture Production and Digital Inclusion in Developing Countries", November 2007
"TEDx Talk on music, technology, global peripheries, and internet regulation" 2009

Notes

External links

Creative Commons
Open content activists
Computer law activists
Copyright scholars
Copyright activists
Academic staff of Fundação Getulio Vargas
University of São Paulo alumni
Harvard Law School alumni
Academic staff of the University of São Paulo
People from Minas Gerais
21st-century Brazilian lawyers
1976 births
Living people
Brazilian columnists
Academic staff of the Rio de Janeiro State University
Facebook Oversight Board members